Events from the year 1591 in the Kingdom of Scotland.

Incumbents
Monarch – James VI

Events
 February – Brian O'Rourke, rebel lord of West Bréifne in Ireland, seeks right of asylum in Scotland
 3 April – Brian O'Rourke is arrested in Glasgow and delivered to the English
 27 December - Raid of Holyrood, the rebel Francis Stewart, 5th Earl of Bothwell breaks into Holyroodhouse.
 December – James VI's Newes from Scotland – declaring the damnable life and death of Dr. John Fian is published in London
Burgh of Cockenzie created by James VI
Canongate Tolbooth built in Edinburgh

Births
 March – Donald Mackay, 1st Lord Reay, soldier (died 1649)
Adam Steuart, philosopher (died 1645 in Leiden)

Deaths
 28 January – Agnes Sampson, executed as a witch
 16 December – Dr. John Fian, executed as a sorcerer
John Erskine of Dun, religious reformer (born 1509)
Andrew Stewart, 2nd Lord Ochiltree (born c.1521)

See also
 Timeline of Scottish history

References